Toot may refer to:

Places
 Toot or Tut, Markazi, a village in Iran
 Mount Victoria Tunnel, a road tunnel in Wellington, New Zealand, colloquially known as "Toot Tunnel"
 Toot Oilfield, an oil field in northern Pakistan
 Toot Sahib, a temple in Amritsar, Punjab, India

People with the name
 Don Cahoon (born 1949), American retired college ice hockey coach, nicknamed "Toot"
 Madelyn Dunham (1922–2008), grandmother of U.S. president Barack Obama, nicknamed "Toot"

Fictional characters
 Toot, the title character of Toot the Tiny Tugboat, a British children's animated television series
 Toot, in Holly Hobbie's Toot & Puddle children's book series 
 Toot Braunstein, in the animated series Drawn Together

Other uses
 Toot, to "pass gas"; flatulence
 Toot, to play a horn (instrument)
 Toot, the historical term for messages posted on Mastodon (social network)
 Toot, to sound an automobile or vehicle horn

See also

 Toon (disambiguation)
 Toos (disambiguation)
 Toot Hill (disambiguation)
 Toot Toot (disambiguation)
 Tooting (disambiguation) 
 Toots (disambiguation)